Ẕāmi Kalay is a town located in Zabol Province, Afghanistan in the Shinkay District. The population is around 1,657 people living there. The town is near Qalat.

See also
 Zabul Province

References

Populated places in Zabul Province